Lac de Tignes is a lake at Tignes  in the Savoie department of France.

Tignes